Peter Jarvis (born 1959) is an American percussionist, drummer, conductor, composer, music copyist, print music editor and college professor.

Career
Peter Jarvis (born in Hackensack, New Jersey) is a percussionist, drummer, conductor, composer, music copyist, print music editor and college professor. He is an associate director of the Composer Concordance and co-director of Composers Concordance Records. He teaches music at Bergen Community College.

Jarvis composed, orchestrated, arranged and performed music for Moonrise Kingdom, a film by Wes Anderson, which opened the Cannes Film Festival on May 16, 2012. Moonrise Kingdom received a Golden Globe nomination for "Best Score" and an Academy Award nomination in 2013. His involvement in the film as a composer included various individual projects ranging from adding music to a score by Benjamin Britten and composing original music for several scenes. As arranger and orchestrator he worked on music composed by Mark Mothersbaugh and as performer he led a percussion section and provided several improvisations. He has also performed his own solo percussion music for the second, third, fourth and fifth seasons of the HBO Series "Boardwalk Empire." During the third season, his music appeared in seven episodes. More recently Jarvis worked on Ang Lee’s movie Billy Lynn’s Long Halftime Walk, released in 2016; his involvement on the project included transcribing, arranging and as percussionist. More recently he recorded for the sound track of "The Pale Blue Eye" a film directed by Scott Cooper, starring Christian Bale.

Over the decades, as a freelance musician, he has performed popular and unpopular music with equal enthusiasm. He has performed as a soloist, chamber player, Broadway musician and as conductor with chamber music ensembles including the Velez / Jarvis Duo, the Chamber Music Society of Lincoln Center, CompCord Ensemble, The Group for Contemporary Music, Saint Luke's Chamber Ensemble, the New Jersey Percussion Ensemble (which he directs) and on new music/arts festivals such as the Europe/Asia Festival and the Hong Kong Arts Festival and in orchestras and with choruses. He has performed for PBS, Russian and Hong Kong television. The New York Times has said about Jarvis's conducting: "... [He] did full justice to its rhythmic complexities; Mr. Jarvis and his forces richly deserved the standing ovation they received."

Jarvis has performed and or recorded with composers musicians such as Milton Babbitt, John Cage and Steve Reich. He is active as a percussionist, conductor and composer in New Jersey, New York, Connecticut and elsewhere. As conductor he has appeared with the Saint Luke's Chamber Ensemble, the New Jersey Percussion Ensemble, Composers Concordance, Ensemble21 and several other groups. He has appeared as guest conductor on the San Francisco Symphony's New and Unusual Music Series with the New Jersey Percussion Ensemble. The proliferation of percussion literature is extremely important to Jarvis and he has performed nearly 100 solo pieces for multi-percussion, timpani, vibraphone, marimba, solo snare drum and drum set composed for him.

His compositions are published by Calabrese Brothers Music LLC, Indian Paintbrush Productions, Peter Jarvis Music Publishing, and L-T Music Publishing. He is a member of Broadcast Music, Inc.

Press coverage

The New York Times wrote that Jarvis "led the New Jersey Percussion Ensemble in a precise, tactile performance with an elastic pulse", and that the "Percussion Symphony" was "a mammoth work ... on its way to becoming a genuine 20th-century warhorse" which Jarvis conducted from memory. The Record described Jarvis's conducting of "Percussion Symphony" as "a masterful example of the conductors craft", and praised the way he sculpted the melody in the medieval song by Guillaume Dufay. The New Music Connoisseur mentioned that "While the new music scene abounds with percussionists, only a very few can match the awesome musicianship of Peter Jarvis" and further described his performance of Ron Mazurek's Masked Dances as "the highlight of the evening". According to Raul da Gamma of Jazz da Gamma, "This is a duet recording by two musicians (Peter Jarvis and Gene Pritsker) of impeccable pedigree." (August 1, 2016). In Percussive Notes, the official journal of the Percussive Arts Society, Quintin Mallette wrote "... by the seminal performer, composer, and conductor Peter Jarvis". He went on to say "I recommend this recording not only for its artistic merits, but also for its pedagogical merit as a tool for exploring the less tangible aspects of musicianship necessary in chamber music settings."

Transcriptions
Published by Calabrese Brothers Music, LLC.

Chamber
 Rockaby for voice and piano (2003) – Ron Mazurek, transcribed for voice and vibraphone, Op. 14 (2011) by Peter Jarvis, premiered by the William Paterson University New Music Ensemble; Erica Tanner and Nicolas Doktor, March 28, 2011, at William Paterson University, Wayne, New Jersey.
 Fugue in G minor, "Little" BWV 578 – Johann Sebastian Bach, transcribed for Mallet Quartet, Op. 12 (2010) by Peter Jarvis.

Film and television

Film
 2021 - "The Pale BLue Eye", directed by Scott Cooper
 2016 - "Biil Lynn's Long Halftime Walk", directed by Ang Lee.
 2011 – "Moonrise Kingdom", Op. 19 – music for the movie directed by Wes Anderson; Moonrise Kingdom, Op. 19, refers to all music Jarvis worked on including original music, arrangements and transcriptions. Published by Indian Paintbrush Productions.

Television
 Surveying Carnage, Op. 21 (2012) – percussion solos, improvisations for the HBO series Boardwalk Empire – season 3, multiple episodes. Published by L-T Music Publishing.
 On the Boardwalk, Op. 18 (2011) – percussion solo, a multi-track improvisation for the HBO series Boardwalk Empire. Used in episode 10 of season 2: "Georgia Peaches" aired on November 27, 2011. Published by L-T Music Publishing.

Documentary
 1995 – Musical Outsiders: An American Legacy – Harry Partch, Lou Harrison, and Terry Riley. Directed by Michael Blackwood. Performing with NewBand.

DVDs (partial list)
 Billy Lynn's Long Halftime Walk (released November 11, 2016) – A TriStar Pictures release. Written by Jean-Christophe Castelli, directed by Ang Lee. Various transcriptions, arrangements, and improvisations by Peter Jarvis on the soundtrack.
 Moonrise Kingdom (released October 16, 2012) – An American Empirical Picture presented by Focus Features and Indian Paintbrush. Written by Wes Anderson and Roman Coppola, directed by Wes Anderson. Various compositions, arrangements, orchestrations and performances by Peter Jarvis on the soundtrack.
 Boardwalk Empire – Seasons 2-5, – An HBO Production. "Georgia Peaches" (episode 10), solo percussion performance of "On the Boardwalk" by Peter Jarvis on the soundtrack. During seasons 2-5 Jarvis performs in over 10 episodes.

Discography (partial list)

Composer/percussionist/conductor
 Jarvis and Friends, Volume 3 – With Chris Opperman performing duos with Jarvis, and several others performing music by Jarvis. Composers Concordance Records COMCON0063 – NAXOS
Dragonfly – Peter Jarvis and William Schimmel – All music by Jarvis and Schimmel – Composers Concordance Records COMCON0060 – NAXOS
Der Weg Ins Freie – William Anderson – Cygnus Ensemble – FURIOUS ARTISANS Productions – FACD6819
Chamber Music from Hell – Chris Opperman "Owl Flight" recorded by the New Jersey Percussion Ensemble.
Jarvis and Friends, Volume 2 – With Payton MacDonald, Kevin Norton, Gene Pritsker, and David Taylor – Composers Concordance Records – NAXOS
Payton MacDonald: Solo Marimba My Ous 16 "Saties Hammock" Composers Concordance Records – COMCON0051 – NAXOS
Jarvis and Friends, Volume 1 – With Glen Velez, Franz Hackl, William Schimmel, and John Clark. – Composers Concordance Records COMCON0046 – NAXOS
New Jersey Percussion Ensemble and Friends at 50, Volume 1 – Composers Concordance Records COMCON0045 – NAXOS
Explorations – "Chamber Setting No. 2" – Robert Pollock, New Jersey Percussion Ensemble, Peter Jarvis, conductor – Ebb and Flow Arts
New Music For Percussion: Night Music – Jeffrey Kresky, John Ferrari, Peter Jarvis and Payton MacDonald – Percussion. Drumming For Milton" by Peter Jarvis, Paul Carroll drum set. "Concerto for Vibraphone and Percussion Ensemble" by Peter Jarvis, performed by the New Jersey Percussion Ensemble, John Ferrari – vibraphone soloist, Peter Jarvis – conductor. William Paterson University Recording Label. Recorded in 2014.Moonrise Kingdom – The Original Soundtrack; Track 2 performed by Peter Jarvis. Label: AbkcoJersey Sessions Volume 2: Passing Fancies – Stephen Peles, Peter Jarvis – Percussion, Robert Pollock – Piano, Music for Winds, Percussion, 'Cello & Voices – Rolv Yttrehus – Composers Guild of New Jersey Performance Ensemble, Peter Jarvis, conductor, Composers Guild of New Jersey, 1990, #CGNJ 0990

Percussionist
 Milton Babbitt – A Composers' Memorial; For Milton, Composed by David Saperstein, Peter Jarvis – vibraphone. Perspectives of New Music/Open Space Records, 2012, pnm/os cd 3
 ballets and solos; The International Street Cannibals Ensemble – Solo for Pete, Composed by Patrick Hardish, Peter Jarvis – drum set. Composers Concordance Records – on Naxos
 Milton Babbitt: Soli e Duettini; Homily for Solo Snare Drum, The Group for Contemporary Music, Koch International, 1996, 3-7335-2H1 and Naxos 8.559259
 Society of Composers, Inc.: Milestones; Night Black Bird Song, for 2 piccolos & 3 percussionists – Emily Doolittle, Capstone Records, CD #8701
American Classics – George Antheil: Ballet Mécanique – Philadelphia Virtuosi Chamber Orchestra – Naxos 8.559060
 Floating Bridge – ECM Tour; Floating Bridge – Kung Chi Shing, recorded live in Taiwan – Kung Ensemble, October Music, 1996, ECM Tour in Taiwan
 Destiny Travels Limited; Destiny Travels Limited – Kung Chi Shing, recorded live in Hong Kong – Kung Ensemble, October Music, 1996, #5
 Andrew Ford: Icarus; Chamber Concerto No. 3: In Constant Light – Terra Australis Incognita, Tall Poppies #150
 New Sounds From The Village; Encounters – Ron Mazurek – Percussion Quartet, Capstone Records, 1994, #CPS 8616
 Jersey Sessions Volume 3: In Search Of. . . Percussion Solo with Electronic Sound – Ron Mazurek, Peter Jarvis – Percussion, Ballet Mécanique – George Antheil, Composers Guild of New Jersey, 1992, #CGNJ 0393;

Conductor
 David Rakowski: Hyper Blue; Ensemble21 – Sesso e Violenza, Peter Jarvis, conductor, tracks 6, 7 & 8. CRI CD820 
 Charles Wuorinen: The Group for Contemporary Music – Percussion Quartet – Charles Wuorinen – Peter Jarvis, conductor, Koch International, 1997, #3-7410-2H1
 Charles Wuorinen: Tashi – New Jersey Percussion Ensemble –  Percussion Quartet – Charles Wuorinen – Peter Jarvis, conductor, NAXOS 8.559321The Music of Rolv Yttrehus – Music for Winds, Percussion, 'Cello & Voices, Composers Guild of New Jersey Performance Ensemble – Peter Jarvis, conductor, CRI CD 843
 Jersey Sessions Volume 1: Concertino – Roger Sessions, CGNJ Performance Ensemble, David Gilbert, conductor, Revolution – Robert Pollock, Cygnus Ensemble, Joel Suben, conductor, Composers Guild of New Jersey, 1989, #CGNJ 0989
 Percussion Music; Percussion Symphony – Charles Wuorinen, Charles Wuorinen, conductor, Elektra/Nonesuch, 1988, #979150-2
 Music of David Olan and Chester Biscardi; Prism – David Olan, Peter Jarvis, conductor, Composer's Recording Inc., 1986, #CRI CD 585

References

External links

American percussionists
American male composers
20th-century American composers
1959 births
Living people
People from Hackensack, New Jersey
Musicians from New Jersey
Connecticut College faculty
William Paterson University faculty
20th-century American drummers
American male drummers
20th-century American male musicians